Las Palmas II is a census-designated place (CDP) in Cameron County, in the U.S. state of Texas. (The "II" distinguishes the CDP from Las Palmas, a CDP in Zapata County, Texas.) The population was 1,605 at the 2010 census. Prior to the 2010 census the community was part of the Las Palmas-Juarez CDP. It is part of the Brownsville–Harlingen Metropolitan Statistical Area.

Geography
Las Palmas is in western Cameron County, bordered to the north by Harlingen and to the east by Juarez.

References

Census-designated places in Cameron County, Texas
Census-designated places in Texas